Mueang Songkhla (Pattani Malay: ซิงกอรอ) is the capital district (amphoe mueang) of Songkhla province, southern Thailand.

Geography

Neighboring districts are (from the south clockwise): Chana, Na Mom, Hat Yai, and Singhanakhon of Songkhla Province. To the east is the Gulf of Thailand.

In the northern part of the district is Songkhla Lake.

History
The name Songkhla is a Thai corruption of Singgora, its original name, which means 'the city of lions' in Malay. It refers to a lion-shaped mountain near the city of Songkhla.

Demographics
The majority of the population of Mueang Songkhla is Thai with a significant number of Thai Malays. The main language spoken in this area is Southern and Central Thai dialect with local varieties of Songkhla Malay. Buddhism is the majority religion here with a sizable amount of Islam embraced by Thai Malays and a mixed ethnicity called Samsam.

Administration

Central administration 
Mueang Songkhla district is divided into six sub-districts (tambons), which are further subdivided into 47 administrative villages (mubans).

Local administration 
There is one city (thesaban nakhon) in the district:
 Songkhla consisting of sub-district Bo Yang.

There is one town (thesaban mueang) in the district:
 Khao Rup Chang consisting of sub-district Khao Rup Chang.

There are two sub-district municipalities (thesaban tambons) in the district:
 Phawong consisting of sub-district Phawong.
 Ko Taeo consisting of sub-district Ko Taeo.

There are two sub-district administrative organizations (SAO) in the district:
 Thung Wang consisting of sub-district Thung Wang.
 Ko Yo consisting of sub-district Ko Yo.

References

External links
Mueang Songkhla 

Songkhla
Districts of Songkhla province